Akropotamos is a village of the Chalkidona municipality. Before the 2011 local government reform it was part of the municipality of Koufalia. The 2011 census recorded 596 inhabitants in the village. Akropotamos is a part of the community of Prochoma.

History
The population of Akropotamos consists of Greek refugees from Pontus.

See also
 List of settlements in the Thessaloniki regional unit

References

Populated places in Thessaloniki (regional unit)